Cox Nunatak is a nunatak,  high, standing  south of Rankine Rock in the northeastern Dufek Massif, Pensacola Mountains. It was mapped by the United States Geological Survey from surveys and from U.S. Navy air photos, 1956–66, and named by the Advisory Committee on Antarctic Names for Walter M. Cox, a photographer with the Ellsworth Station winter party, 1957.

References 

 
Nunataks of Queen Elizabeth Land